This is a list of notable books about, or related to, the Skinhead subculture.

Non-fiction
A Boy's Story : Martin King
A Propos du Phenomene des Skinheads et du Racisme en Suisse
American Skinheads - The Criminology and Control of Hate Crime : Mark S. Hamm
Back from the Brink: Rebellious Youth, Skinhead and Addict : Noel Davidson
Blood Crimes: The Pennsylvania Skinhead Murders : Fred Rosen
Blood in the Face: The Ku Klux Klan, Aryan Nations, Nazi Skinheads, and the Rise of a New White Culture : James Ridgeway
Boss Sounds : Classic Skinhead Reggae : Marc Griffiths
Cream Of The Crops : Mark Brown
Football Hooliganism and the Skinheads : John Clarke
Gewalt gegen Fremde: Rechtsradikale, Skinheads und Mitläufer :
Jugendliche Subkulturen - Hooligans und Skinheads: Entstehung, Verbreitung und gesellschaftliche Auswirkung am Beispiel der Fans der Böhsen Onkelz : Stefan Rapp
Les Skinheads et l'Extreme Droite : Daniel Hubert
Mordskameradschaft. cbt. Tim, unter Skinheads geraten : Carlo Ross
Neonazis en España: De las Audiciones Wagnerianas a los Skinheads (1966–1995) : Xavier Casals
No Retreat : Dave Hann and Steve Hilsey
Noheads : Auerbach
Oi for England : Trevor Griffiths
Oi! Stories : Kid Stoker
Punkare och Skinheads : Socialisering i Gäng : Julio Ferrer
Rechte Kerle: Skinheads, Faschos, Hooligans : Burkhard Schröder
Skins : Gavin Watson
Skins and Punks : Lost Archives 1978–1985 : Gavin Watson
Skinhead : Nick Knight
Skinheads : C. Ryan (London, 1981)
Skinheads a Catalunya
Skinhead: A Way Of Life : Klaus Farin
Skinhead Confessions: From Hate to Hope : T. J. Leyden with Bridget M. Cook
Skinhead International: A Worldwide Survey of Neo-Nazi Skinheads : B'Nai B'Rith Anti-Defamation League	
Skinhead Nation : George Marshall
Skinheads : Eberhard Seidel-Peilen and Klaus Farin
Skinheads and the Study of Youth Culture : John Clarke
Skinheads : Ästhetik und Gewalt : Susanne El-Nawab
Skinheads Gothics Rockabillies : Gewalt, Tod & Rock 'n' Roll : Susanne El-Nawab
Skinheads. Portrait einer Subkultur : Christian Menhorn
Skinheads In Deutschland : M. Eberwein and J. Drexler
Skinheads, Rastas and Hippies : John Williams
Skinheads : Roman : Roger Martin
Skinheads Shaved for Battle : A Cultural History of American Skinheads : Jack B. Moore
Skinhead Street Gangs : Loren Christensen
Skinheads und die Gesellschaftliche Rechte : Frank Lauenburg
Skinstreet - The Skinhead Way of Life : Angelo Sindaco
Spirit of '69 - A Skinhead Bible : George Marshall
Stiefel, Bomberjacke, jede Menge Zoff: ein Skin steigt aus : Michael ackermann
Surfers, Soulies, Skinheads and Skaters: Subcultural Style from the Forties to the Nineties : Claudia Schnurmann, Cathie Dingwall and Daniel F. McGrath
Swansea Jacks : From Skinheads to Stone Island - Forty Years of One of Britain's Most Notorious Hooligan Gangs : Andrew Tooze and Martin King
The Lads in Action : Ethnicity, Identity and Social Process Amongst Australian Skinheads : David Moore
The Paint House : Words from an East End Gang : S. Daniel, P. Doyle and P. McGuire
The Story of Oi: A View from the Dead End of the Street : Garry Johnson
The Way We Wore : A Life In Threads : Robert Elms
Skinhead: Lo stile della strada : Riccardo Pedrini
Ultras y Skinheads : La Juventud Visible : Imagenes, Estilos y Conflictos de Las Subculturas Juveniles En Espana : Teresa Adan Revilla
Unter Glatzen. Meine Begegnungen mit Skinheads : Christiane Tramitz
Von Skinheads keine Spur : Lutz von Dijk
Want Some Aggro? : Cass Pennant and Micky Smith
White Noise: Inside the International Nazi Skinhead Scene : Nick Lowles

Fiction
American Skin : Don De Grazia
Booted and Suited : Chris Brown
Blind : K. Rodriguez
Cherry Docs : David Gow
Code of the Roadies : Ted Ottley
Come Before Christ and Murder Love : Stewart Home
Dragon Skins : Richard Allen
England Belongs to Me : Steve Goodman
Gay Skins: Class, Masculinity and Queer Appropriation : Murray Healy
Moonstomp! Volume One: Nite Klub : Natassja Noctis
Raiders Of The Lost Forehead : Stanley Manly
Ratz are Nice : Lawrence Ytzhak Braithwaite
Red London : Stewart Home
Skavoovee : Ska Child and David Harris
Skin : Peter Milligan (comic book)
Skinhead : Jay Bennett
Skinheads : John King
Skinhead: Simon Wellington - 2020 -  
Skinheads, Taggers, Zulus & Co. : Patrick Louis
Slow Death : Stewart Home
The Complete Richard Allen Volume 1 (Skinhead, Suedehead, Skinhead Escapes) : Richard Allen
The Complete Richard Allen Volume 2 (Skinhead Girls, Sorts, Knuckle Girls) : Richard Allen
The Complete Richard Allen Volume 3 (Trouble for Skinhead, Skinhead Farewell, Top Gear Skin) : Richard Allen
Skinhead Away : Marcus Blakeston

Notes

Skinhead
Skinhead